Georg Otto Hilmar (10 October 1876 in Berlin – 12 December 1911 in Berlin), commonly known as Georg Hillmar, was a German gymnast. He competed at the 1896 Summer Olympics in Athens. Hillmar won two gold medals as a member of the German team that won both of the team events, the parallel bars and the horizontal bar. He had less success in the individual events, contesting the parallel bars, horizontal bar, vault, and pommel horse without earning any medals.

References

External links

1876 births
1911 deaths
German male artistic gymnasts
Gymnasts at the 1896 Summer Olympics
19th-century sportsmen
Olympic medalists in gymnastics
Olympic gold medalists for Germany
Medalists at the 1896 Summer Olympics
Gymnasts from Berlin
19th-century German people
20th-century German people